This article lists the presidents of Syria since 1920.

List of officeholders

Syria (1922–1958)

United Arab Republic (1958–1961)

Syria (1961–present)

Timeline

See also
President of Syria
Vice President of Syria
Prime Minister of Syria
List of prime ministers of Syria
Speaker of the People's Assembly of Syria

References
General

Bibliography

 

Syria, List of Presidents of

Presidents